= Barrows Store, Virginia =

Unincorporated community in Virginia, United States

Coordinates: 36°56′06″N 77°58′44″W

Barrows Store is an unincorporated community located in Brunswick County, in the U.S. state of Virginia.
